Orf is a farmyard pox, a type of zoonosis. It causes small pustules in the skin of primarily sheep and goats, but can also occur on the hands of humans. A pale halo forms around a red centre. It may persist for several weeks before crusting and then either resolves or leaves a hard lump. There is usually only one lesion, but there may be many, and they are not painful. Sometimes there are swollen lymph glands.

It is caused by a Parapoxvirus. It can occur in humans who handle infected animals or contaminated objects. One third of cases may develop erythema multiforme. Once resolved, a person can still be infected again.

Generally, treatment options are limited. Injecting the lesion with cidofovir or applying imiquimod has been tried. It is sometimes necessary to cut them out. The vaccine used in sheep to prevent orf is live and has been known to cause disease in humans.

The disease is endemic in livestock herds worldwide. A recent outbreak emerged in southwest Ethiopia between October 2019 and May 2020.

Humans
Orf is a zoonotic disease, meaning humans can contract this disorder through direct contact with infected sheep and goats or with fomites carrying the orf virus. It causes a purulent-appearing papule locally and generally no systemic symptoms. Infected locations can include the finger, hand, arm, face and even the penis (caused by infection either from contact with the hand during urination or from bestiality). Consequently, it is important to observe good personal hygiene and to wear gloves when treating infected animals. It may appear similar to cowpox and pseudocowpox.

While orf is usually a benign self-limiting illness which resolves in 3-6 weeks, in the immunocompromised it can be very progressive and even life-threatening. One percent topical cidofovir has been successfully used in a few patients with progressive disease. Serious damage may be inflicted on the eye if it is infected by orf, even among healthy individuals. The virus can survive in the soil for at least six months.

Other animals
Orf is primarily a disease of sheep and goats although it has been reported as a natural disease in humans, steenbok and alpacas, chamois and tahrs, reindeer, musk oxen, dogs, cats, mountain goats, bighorn sheep, dall sheep, and red squirrels.

Sheep and goats
It has been recorded since the late 19th century and has been reported from most sheep-or goat-raising areas, including those in Europe, the Middle East, the United States, Africa, Asia, South America, Canada, New Zealand and Australia. Orf is spread by fomites and direct contact. In some environments, infection is injected by scratches from thistles of both growing and felled plants. Symptoms include papules and pustules on the lips and muzzle, and less commonly in the mouth of young lambs and on the eyelids, feet, and teats of ewes. The lesions progress to thick crusts which may bleed. Orf in the mouths of lambs may prevent suckling and cause weight loss, and can infect the udder of the mother ewe, thus potentially leading to mastitis. Sheep are prone to reinfection. Occasionally the infection can be extensive and persistent if the animal does not produce an immune response.

A live virus vaccine is made from scab material and usually given to ewes at the age of two months, but only to lambs when there is an outbreak. The vaccine can cause disease in humans.

In sheep and goats, the lesions mostly appear on or near the hairline and elsewhere on the lips and muzzle. In some cases the lesions appear on and in the nostrils, around the eyes, on the thigh, coronet, vulva, udder, and axilla. In rare cases, mostly involving young lambs, lesions are found on the tongue, gums, roof of the mouth and the oesophagus. It has also been reported a number of times to cause lesions in the rumen. In one case it was shown that a severe form of orf virus caused an outbreak involving the gastrointestinal tract, lungs, heart, as well as the buccal cavity, cheeks, tongue and lips. Another severe case was reported pharyngitis, genital lesions and infection of the hooves which led to lameness and, in some cases, sloughing of the hoof.

More typically, sheep will become free of orf within a week or so as the disease runs its course. Sheep custodians can assist by ensuring infected lambs receive sufficient milk and separating out the infected stock to slow down cross-transmission to healthy animals. It is advisable for those handling infected animals to wear disposable gloves to prevent cross infection and self-infection. A veterinarian must be contacted if there is a risk of misdiagnosis with other, more serious conditions.

See also 
 Ecthyma
 List of cutaneous conditions
 List of immunofluorescence findings for autoimmune bullous conditions
 Imiquimod
 Cidofovir

References

External links 

Sheep and goat diseases
Chordopoxvirinae
Animal viral diseases
Virus-related cutaneous conditions
 Farm Health Online: Disease Management of Orf Virus in Sheep